is a type of musical theatre popular in the state of Goa on the west coast of India as well as in Mumbai and with expatriate communities in the Middle East, United Kingdom and other cities where Konkani speakers have a considerable presence. The dramas are performed mainly in the Roman Konkani dialects and include music, dancing and singing.  performers are called tiatrists.

Etymology

The word  comes from the Portuguese word for theatre, .

Description
 today revolves around social, religious and political themes. It is considered to be a mirror of Goan culture. The drama consists of six or seven acts called . The acts are interspersed by songs which need not be directly linked to the content or the issues of the main drama. There are two or three songs between each of the acts.

Tiatrists have always demonstrated a very high degree of social awareness. Despite centuries of Portuguese suppression and post-liberation neglect from the state governments,  as an art form has not just survived but thrived and reinvented itself in many ways. 

Songs
Other songs, called , are generally either comedic or based on topical, political and controversial issues that are interspersed through the performance. These musical interludes are independent of the main theme of the play. The songs are often satirical and unsparing of the politics and politicians of Goa. The music is provided by a live band including keyboard, trumpet, saxophone, bass guitar and drums.

Tiatr today
Besides the regular commercial shows,  are held as part of the celebrations of nearly every church and chapel feast in the state.

The Goa Kala Academy organises a state-level  competition every year while the Tiatr Academy organises a popular  competition for dramas which has exceeded 25 performances.

 songs and performances are recorded and sold on CD and DVD in Goan and Middle Eastern markets. 

Although efforts have been made to preserve the art form as a tradition of Goa, there have been calls for greater recognition of Mumbai-based tiatrists.

Khell tiatr
It differs from the Konkani  in another respect, that is, that its songs are integrated with the main drama and do not deviate in content from it.

History

Both of them had their distinct style.

Costancio Lucasinho Caridade Ribeiro, more popularly known as Lucasinho Ribeiro, who was from Assagao, was seeking employment in Bombay. Passionate about the performing arts, he was highly impressed with the stylised Italian operas performed there. He took up a job for an Italian opera troupe which was touring Indian cities at the time, staging an opera called Italian Boy. When the troupe left India, Lucazinho Ribeiro bought the costumes used in the play with the intention of staging a Konkani play on the style of the Italian Opera. His collaborators in the effort were Caetaninho Fernandes of Taleigao and João Agostinho Fernandes of Borda, Margao.

On Easter Sunday, 17 April 1892, the first-ever  performance, Italian Bhurgo, adapted from the Italian play, was staged at the New Alfred Theatre, Bombay. Since there were many different scenes in this  and it required different stage sets, they thought of dropping the curtain and performing songs and dances in front of it. This was needed to entertain the audience while the stage setting was being done behind the curtain. These songs and dances did not have any relevance to the theme of the play.

The first original  script was written and directed by João Agostinho Fernandes in 1895 in Bombay and was titled Belle de Cavel or Sundori Cavelchi. For all his consistent devotion and encouragement over fifty years, Fernandes was conferred the title Pai Tiatrist ('Father Tiatrist').

Divorce, a  written and directed by Airistides Dias, was the first  to complete 100 performances on 5 October 1980.

In 1956 the  underwent a dramatic change. Helped by his friend and colleague Antonio Marian, the khell was performed on a stage for the first time with a backdrop and other paraphernalia associated with theatre. However, this form became very popular only in the 1970s when Rosario Rodrigues coined the term  and came up with extremely successful shows. Thus, the ground-based plays known as  evolved onto the stage and further into 'non-stop dramas'.

 contributed to keeping the Konkani language alive during Portuguese colonial rule, when Konkani was suppressed.  played a major role in the struggle to make Konkani the official language of Goa.

In 2008 legislation was approved granting 15 lakh rupees to the newly formed Tiatr Academy of Goa.

List of tiatrists

Past tiatrists

Active tiatrists

References

 
Goan music
Theatre in India
Performing arts in India
Culture of Goa